Daasa is a 2003 Kannada-language action drama film directed and written by P. N. Sathya. The film stars Darshan and Amrutha whilst Sathyajtih and Avinash play other pivotal roles.

The film featured an original score and soundtrack composed by Sadhu Kokila. The film ran for a hundred days.

Plot

Cast 
 Darshan as Mohan Das
 Amrutha
 Sathyajith
 Avinash
 Lohitashwa
 Padma Vasanthi
 Chitra Shenoy
Mallesh Gowda 
P. N. Sathya 
Madhugiri Prakash 
Junior Narasimharaju 
Hulivana Gangadharayya 
Apoorva 
Ramesh Pandith 
NGEF Ramamurthy 
Bank Suresh 
Bullet Prakash 
Michael Madhu

Soundtrack 
The music was composed by Sadhu Kokila.

Reception
Chitraloka said of the film, "It is a punching and power packed performance once again from Darshan. Avinash shouts and salutes as they encounter Amar. Satyajit screams a lot and succumbs to Dasa’s strategies. Amrutha is tolerable. Songs does not deserve any mention. Cinematography is apt."

References 

2003 films
2003 action drama films
2000s Kannada-language films
Indian action drama films
Films directed by P. N. Sathya